Ismael Said Athuman González (born 1 February 1995) is a professional footballer who plays for the Kenya national team. Mainly a central defender, he can also play as a defensive midfielder.

Club career
Athuman was born in San Bartolomé de Tirajana, Las Palmas, Canary Islands, to a Kenyan father and a Spanish mother, and played youth football with CD Maspalomas, UD Vecindario and UD Las Palmas. He had unsuccessful trials at Manchester City in 2013.

After making his senior debut with Las Palmas' C-team in the regional leagues during the 2014–15 campaign, Athuman subsequently started to appear for the reserves in both Segunda División B and Tercera División. On 5 December 2015, he agreed to a loan deal with third division side CP Cacereño until the end of the season.

Athuman subsequently returned to Las Palmas B in July 2016, but rescinded his contract the following 31 January, and subsequently signed for Granada CF's reserves in the third tier. On 13 July 2017, he moved to fellow league team CF Fuenlabrada.

On 22 August 2018, Athuman returned to Las Palmas and their B-side, now also in the third division. He left the club in the following July, but rejoined the side on 2 January 2020.

On 5 October 2020, after playing for the main squad during the entire pre-season, Athuman was promoted to Las Palmas' first team in Segunda División. He made his professional debut on 5 December, starting in a 0–0 away draw against SD Ponferradina.

International career
Athuman received his first call from Kenya in mid May 2016, for a 2017 Africa Cup of Nations qualifying match against Congo the following month. He made his debut on 31 May 2016 in a friendly with Sudan. He has also represented Kenya at the 2019 Africa Cup of Nations.

Personal life
Athuman's father, Said Ali Athuman Mbaga, known as Billy, is a Kenyan contortionist and acrobat, who lives in Gran Canaria.

References

External links 

1995 births
Living people
People from Gran Canaria
Sportspeople from the Province of Las Palmas
Spanish people of Kenyan descent
Spanish sportspeople of African descent
People with acquired Kenyan citizenship
Kenyan people of Spanish descent
Kenyan footballers
Spanish footballers
Footballers from the Canary Islands
Association football central defenders
Association football midfielders
Segunda División players
Segunda División B players
Tercera División players
Divisiones Regionales de Fútbol players
UD Las Palmas C players
UD Las Palmas Atlético players
CP Cacereño players
Club Recreativo Granada players
CF Fuenlabrada footballers
UD Las Palmas players
Real Murcia players
CE Sabadell FC footballers
2019 Africa Cup of Nations players
Kenya international footballers